In enzymology, a 2-hydroxy-3-oxopropionate reductase is an enzyme that catalyzes the chemical reaction

(R)-glycerate + NAD(P)+  2-hydroxy-3-oxopropanoate + NAD(P)H + H+

The 3 substrates of this enzyme are (R)-glycerate, NAD+, and NADP+, whereas its 4 products are 2-hydroxy-3-oxopropanoate, NADH, NADPH, and H+.

This enzyme belongs to the family of oxidoreductases, specifically those acting on the CH-OH group of donor with NAD+ or NADP+ as acceptor. The systematic name of this enzyme class is (R)-glycerate:NAD(P)+ oxidoreductase. This enzyme is also called tartronate semialdehyde reductase. This enzyme participates in glyoxylate and dicarboxylate metabolism.

Structural studies

As of late 2007, only one structure has been solved for this class of enzymes, with the PDB accession code .

References

 

EC 1.1.1
NADPH-dependent enzymes
NADH-dependent enzymes
Enzymes of known structure